Rajiah Simon, is a Professor of Physics at the Institute of Mathematical Sciences, Chennai, India.

Rajiah Simon received the Shanti Swarup Bhatnagar Prize for Science and Technology in 1993 for pioneering work in Quantum optics.

Simon and collaborators initiated the "Quantum theory of charged-particle beam optics",
by working out the focusing action of a magnetic quadrupole using the Dirac Equation.

References

External links
Google Scholar Profile of Rajiah Simon

1948 births
Living people
Indian string theorists
Recipients of the Shanti Swarup Bhatnagar Award in Physical Science